The New Zealand women's national under-21 field hockey team, represents New Zealand in international under-21 field hockey and at the Junior World Cup. The team is controlled by the governing body for field hockey in New Zealand, the New Zealand Hockey Federation, which is currently a member of the Oceania Hockey Federation (OHF) and the International Hockey Federation (FIH).

The team's first recorded appearance was at the 1989 Junior World Cup, where the finished in ninth place.

The team's last appearance was during a Tri–Nations Tournament against Australia and India in Canberra, Australia from November–December 2018.

History

Tournament records

Team

Current squad
The following 18 players were named in the squad for the 2019 Tri-Nations Tournament from 3–8 December, in Canberra, Australia.

Results

Latest results

Australia Test Series

Tri–Nations Tournament

See also
New Zealand women's national field hockey team

References

External links
Official Hockey New Zealand Website

 Under-21
U
Women's national under-21 field hockey teams